SugaRush Beat Company is a musical group consisting of singers Rahsaan Patterson and Ida Corr.

The band formed in 2005, when Patterson was touring in Australia to promote his third album After Hours. While staying in Melbourne he met Rogers, when he booked his studio. 
Following their first sessions they then spent the next couple of months jetting back and forth between Los Angeles and Australia, writing songs together, until the addition of Danish soul singer Ida Corr.

In November 2007, they released their first record, SugaRush Beat Company EP through the UK-label RCA. In February 2008 they appeared on Later With Jools Holland, where they performed their songs L-O-V-E and They Said I Said. A release of the single Gunshots 'n Candyfloss followed soon after in March 2008. In June 2008 they released L-O-V-E as a single along with their first musicvideo produced by Planet of Animation from Melbourne. Their debut album was released in the UK in September 2008 with They Said I Said as the lead single (with a musicvideo as well and with Corr on the lead vocals). In January 2009 SugaRush Beat Company released their single Love Breed with Corr on the lead vocals again.

Discography

Albums

Track listing
 Intro / Walking A Way
 Love Breed
 SugaRush
 L-O-V-E
 Oh Lord (Take Me Back)
 They Said I Said
 Ladies 'n' Gents
 Number One
 No Parking
 Jesus Come Near
 All Of A Suddenly
 Gunshots 'n Candyfloss
 End (feat. Michael Franti)

Singles

References

External links
SugaRushBeat Company interview by Pete Lewis, 'Blues & Soul' March 2008

American contemporary R&B musical groups
Australian contemporary R&B musical groups
American soul musical groups
Australian soul musical groups